The 2006 ATP Tour was the global elite men's professional tennis circuit organised by the Association of Tennis Professionals (ATP) for the 2006 tennis season. The ATP Tour is the elite tour for professional tennis organized by the Association of Tennis Professionals. The ATP Tour includes the four Grand Slam tournaments, the Tennis Masters Cup, the ATP Masters Series, the International Series Gold and the International Series tournaments.

Calendar 
The table below shows the 2006 ATP Tour schedule

Key

January

February

March

April

May

June

July

August

September

October

November

Entry rankings

Statistics

Titles won by player 

 Winners/runners-up by country:

Prize money leaders 
As of 18 December 2006

Retirements 
Following is a list of notable players (winners of a main tour title, and/or part of the ATP rankings top 100 (singles) or top 50 (doubles) for at least one week) who announced their retirement from professional tennis, became inactive (after not playing for more than 52 weeks), or were permanently banned from playing, during the 2006 season:

  Andre Agassi (born April 29, 1970, in Las Vegas, Nevada) He became a professional in 1986, won eight Grand Slam championships and competed in 15 Grand Slam finals, and was a 1996 Olympic gold medalist. He won four Australian Open titles and achieved the Career Grand Slam (all four Grand Slam championships) and was the first of two to achieve the Career Golden Slam (Career Grand Slam and Olympic gold medal), and the only man to win the Career Golden Slam and the ATP Tour World Championships (won in 1990). He also won 17 ATP Masters Series titles, and was part of a winning Davis Cup team in 1990 and 1992. Agassi was troubled by personal issues during the mid-to-late 1990s and sank to world no. 141 in 1997, prompting many to believe that his career was over. Agassi, however, returned to world no. 1 in 1999 and enjoyed the most successful run of his career over the next four years. He played his last match at the US Open against Benjamin Becker in August.
  Wayne Black (born 17 November 1973 in Salisbury, Rhodesia, now Harare, Zimbabwe) He turned professional in 1994 and reached his career-high doubles ranking of no. 4 in 2005. He won the Australian Open in 2005 and the US Open in 2001. He played his last career match at Wimbledon partnering Jeff Coetzee.
  Albert Costa (born 25 June 1975, in Lleida, Spain) He turned professional in 1993 and reached a career-high ranking of world no. 6. He won the French Open in 2002 and was a quarterfinalist at the Australian Open. He won 12 career ATP titles. He played his last career match in Barcelona in April against Dominik Hrbatý.
  Thomas Enqvist (born 13 March 1974 in Stockholm, Sweden) He turned professional in 1991 and reached his career-high ranking of no. 4 in 1999. He was a finalist at the Australian Open in 1999, losing to Yevgeny Kafelnikov, and a quarterfinalist at Wimbledon. He was also a semifinalist at the year-end championships. He played his last match in Luxemburg in November 2005 against George Bastl.
  Nicolas Escudé (born 3 April 1976 in Chartres, France) He turned professional in 1995 and reached his career-high ranking of no. 17 in 2000. He reached the semifinals of the Australian Open in 1998 and the quarterfinals at Wimbledon and the US Open in 2001 and 1999, respectively. He earned four career singles titles. In doubles, he reached his career-high ranking of no. 35 in 2003 and earned two career titles.
  Cyril Suk (born 29 January 1967 in Prague, Czechoslovakia) He turned professional in 1988 and reached his career-high doubles ranking of world no. 7 in 1994. He won the US Open doubles tournament in 1998 and reached the quarterfinals of all the other Grand Slam events multiple times: Australian Open in 1992 and 1994, French Open in 1991, 2001, and 2002, and Wimbledon in 1994, 2002, and 2003. He earned a total of 32 career doubles titles. He won the mixed doubles at the French Open in 1991 and Wimbledon in 1996 and 1997, and reached the final at the Australian Open in 1998 and the US Open in 1995. His last match was in Vienna in October partnering Oliver Marach.

See also 
 List of male tennis players
 Tennis Masters Series
 Tennis Masters Cup
 2006 WTA Tour

References 

 
ATP Tour
ATP Tour seasons